Pentheochaetes is a genus of beetles in the family Cerambycidae, containing the following species:

 Pentheochaetes apicalis Melzer, 1934
 Pentheochaetes argentinus Mendes, 1937
 Pentheochaetes mysticus Melzer, 1932
 Pentheochaetes trinidadensis Gilmour, 1963
 Pentheochaetes turbidus Melzer, 1934

References

Acanthocinini